Davydovo may refer to:
Davydovo, Orekhovo-Zuyevsky District, Moscow Oblast, a village in Orekhovo-Zuyevsky District of Moscow Oblast, Russia
Davydovo, Koverninsky District, Nizhny Novgorod Oblast, a village in Koverninsky District of Nizhny Novgorod Oblast, Russia
Davydovo, Vachsky District, Nizhny Novgorod Oblast, a village (selo) in Vachsky District of Nizhny Novgorod Oblast, Russia
Davydovo, Tver Oblast, a village in Tver Oblast, Russia
Davydovo, name of several other rural localities in Russia